Ken Brierley (3 April 1926 – February 2004) was an English professional footballer who played as a midfielder for Liverpool in The Football League.

Playing career
Brierley joined Oldham Athletic from Range Boilers in 1946 and went on to make 58 league appearances before he signed for Liverpool. He signed for Liverpool in February 1948, and made 10 appearances during the remainder of the 1947–48 season. Brierley was unable to establish him in the starting lineup during his time at the club and moved back to Oldham in March 1953. He left Oldham in 1955, dropping into non-League football with Stalybridge Celtic. In August 1956 he joined Mossley and went on to make 78 appearances in the next two season.

Coaching career
In October 1956 he was appointed manager of Mossley. However, after winning only four of his 23 matches in charge, he was replaced by Pat Murphy.

References

1926 births
English footballers
Oldham Athletic A.F.C. players
Liverpool F.C. players
Stalybridge Celtic F.C. players
Mossley A.F.C. players
English Football League players
2004 deaths
Association football midfielders
Mossley A.F.C. managers
English football managers